The Shire of Johnstone was a local government area of Queensland.

The Mamu tribal group are the traditional owners of much of the land in the shire. 47% of the shire is in the Wet Tropics World Heritage Area.

History

The Hinchinbrook Division was created on 11 November 1879 as one of 74 divisions around Queensland under the Divisional Boards Act 1879. On 28 October 1881, the Johnstone Division split away from it.

With the passage of the Local Authorities Act 1902, Johnstone Division became the Shire of Johnstone on 31 March 1903.

On 22 November 1910 part of Johnstone Shire became Shire of Eacham.

In December 1932, the Johnstone Shire Hall was destroyed by fire. Despite the desire to build a replacement quickly, it was not until 1938 that the new building was completed. The 1938 Johnstone Shire Hall is now listed on the Queensland Heritage Register.

The election of councillors in May 1943 created a sensation with every elected councillor being a candidate of the Ratepayers Party, ousting 7 Labor Party councillors.

In February 2007, the Johnstone Shire Council was sacked by the Queensland Local Government Minister, Andrew Fraser, claiming the shire council had become ineffective due to internal conflict, inappropriate behaviour and financial problems.

On 8 February 2007 the Johnstone Shire Council was sacked by the Queensland Government's Local Government Minister, Andrew Fraser claiming the shire council had become ineffective due to internal conflict, inappropriate behaviour and financial problems, despite an issued show cause presented on 2 August 2006.

Among the perceived gross misconduct were the following incidences:

 The purchase of a $250,000 Steinway Model D Piano with insurance money from Cyclone Larry.
 Former Deputy Mayor George Pervan was quoted on commercial radio during an interview during the aftermath of Cyclone Larry requesting Southern Queenslanders to:

"Send up a truckload of piss so we can all get fucking drunk" – George Pervan – 2006While two councillors attempted to get the Queensland Government to revoke the decision Andrew Fraser stated that while the action was regrettable, it was indeed the correct decision.

On 15 March 2008, under the Local Government (Reform Implementation) Act 2007 passed by the Parliament of Queensland on 10 August 2007, the Shire of Johnstone merged with the Shire of Cardwell to form the Cassowary Coast Region.

Towns and localities
The Shire of Cardwell included the following settlements:

Greater Innisfail area:
 Innisfail
 Belvedere
 Eaton
 East Innisfail
 Eubenangee1
 Goondi
 Goondi Bend
 Goondi Hill
 Hudson
 Innisfail Estate
 Jubilee Heights
 Mighell
 Palmerston2
 Ngatjan1
 South Innisfail
 Webb
 Wooroonooran3

Localities:
 Bingil Bay
 Comoon Loop
 Cowley
 Daradgee
 East Palmerston
 El Arish
 Etty Bay
 Flying Fish Point
 Garners Beach
 Garradunga
 Germantown
 Japoonvale
 Kurrimine Beach
 Mena Creek
 Midgeree Bar
 Mission Beach
 Moresby
 Mourilyan
 Mourilyan Harbour
 Mundoo
 Silkwood
 South Johnstone
 Wangan

1 - shared with Cairns Region
2 - shared with Tablelands Region
3 - shared with Cairns Region and Tablelands Region

Population

Chairmen
 1883 F. E. Nash
 1901: Henry Lawrence Gill
 1903: Henry Lawrence Gill
 1904: Timothy Dempsey
 1907: Charles Edward Jodrell
 1908: John Harvey Payne
 1922—1923: Leontine Joseph Duffy
 1927: Robert David Bliss
 1929—1943: Clarence Stanley Kopsen Page
 1950: Andrew John Murray Laurie

Other notable council members include:
 1982—1985: Vicky Kippin, Member of the Queensland Legislative Assembly for Mourilyan

See also
 List of tramways in Queensland

References

External links

 

 
Former local government areas of Queensland
Far North Queensland
2008 disestablishments in Australia
Populated places disestablished in 2008